The Humble Petition and Advice was the second and last codified constitution of England after the Instrument of Government.

On 23 February 1657, during a sitting of the Second Protectorate Parliament, Sir Christopher Packe, a Member of Parliament and former Lord Mayor of London (chosen by those supporting Kingship as he was a less controversial character than the leaders of the Kingship party), presented the Lord Protector Oliver Cromwell with a remonstrance which became known as the Humble Petition and Advice. Although he presented it, Packe was not the author.

The remonstrance came about largely as a result of the rise of the New Cromwellians, many of whom were moderate Presbyterians like Edward Montagu. They in themselves were an expression of strong latent support for monarchy and the English traditional constitutional limits on its power, a desire to lose the military overtones of the earlier Protectorate and the decreasing level of control Cromwell was able to exert due to ill health and frustration with a lack of revolutionary ideology amongst his subjects.

The intention of the Humble Petition and Advice was to offer a hereditary monarchy to Oliver Cromwell, to assert Parliament's control over new taxation, to provide an independent council to advise the king, to assure the holding of 'Triennial' meetings (every three years) of Parliament, and to reduce the size of the standing army in order to save money, amongst other things. These had the effect of limiting, not increasing, Cromwell's power. However, the real sticking point for many radicals were Clauses 10 through 12; these placed severe restrictions on sects like Fifth Monarchists and Baptists, while seeking to re-establish a national church structured along Presbyterian lines.

Cromwell refused the Crown, on 8 May 1657. There is much speculation among historians as to why he did so. One popular assertion is that he feared disaffection in the army, especially considering the proposed reduction in its size. Others include that he was distressed by allegations of dynastic ambition, he did not genuinely accept that a monarchy was necessary in England, or that he feared reinstating a monarchy on the basis that he believed the monarchy had been judged by God in the period following the First English Civil War.

The Humble Petition and Advice was amended to remove the clause on kingship. The Naylor case caused it also to be modified to include a second chamber.

On 25 May, Cromwell ratified a modified Humble Petition and Advice and said that he would nominate his successor as Lord Protector.

References

Sources
 
 Coward, Barry, The Cromwellian Protectorate New frontiers in history, Manchester University Press, 2002 0719043174, 9780719043178
 
 Fritze,  Ronald H. & Robison, William B. Historical dictionary of Stuart England, 1603-1689, Greenwood Publishing Group, 1996. , 
 Lee, Sidney (1903), Dictionary of National Biography Index and Epitome
Noble, Mark. Memoirs of the protectoral-house of Cromwell: deduced from an early period, and continued down to the present time; ... collected chiefly from original papers and records, ... together with an appendix: ... Embellished with elegant engravings. Volume 1,  The third edition, Printed for G. G. J. and J. Robinson, 1787. page 416.

1657 in law
1657 in England
English laws
Political history of England
Defunct constitutions
Republicanism in England
Oliver Cromwell
Constitution of the United Kingdom
Government of England
1657 in politics
Legal history of England
17th-century documents
Richard Cromwell